Trnjanska Savica or just Savica is a neighbourhood of Zagreb, Croatia, located on the left (northern) bank of Sava river, west of  and east of Staro Trnje, in the city district of Trnje.

Savica was built according to the socialist model of a functional neighbourhood, which is planned to fulfill all day-to-day needs of its inhabitants. Construction of high-rise apartment buildings in Savica is still ongoing, mostly in the southeastern part of the neighbourhood.

Sport 
NK Croatia 98- football club
HTK Chromos Savica- tennis club

Gallery

References

Neighbourhoods of Zagreb